Walter Bronson Dudley, more commonly known as Bide Dudley (8 September 1877 - 4 January 1944) was an American drama critic and playwright. His daughter was actress Doris Dudley.

References

1877 births
1944 deaths
American dramatists and playwrights
American theater critics